Indulekha Warrier (born 15 July 1993) is an Indian playback singer, composer, rapper and an actor. She predominantly works in Malayalam cinema in addition to Tamil and Telugu films. Indulekha is trained in Carnatic classical music, Kathakali Sangeetham traditions and is also a recognised rap artist.

Personal life

Indulekha Warrier was born in Thrissur to Jayaraj Warrier, a Standup Comic/Caricaturist, Actor in the Malayalam film Industry and Usha Jayaraj. Born into a family inclined to arts, Indulekha was introduced to the world of music as a child and started singing at an early age, initially accompanying her father on his tours. She is married to Anand Achuthankutty, a civilian officer with the Indian Defence Accounts Service. The couple have a son Sarang, who was born on 23 December 2021

Career

Indulekha started her career making an acting debut in the movie Loudspeaker (film) in 2009, in which she acted in a song in the movie. She returned as a playback singer in 2014, with the song Eeran Kannino Devaroopam, for the Malayalam movie Apothecary (film). She has since contributed to Malayalam cinema and malayalam rap.

Filmography

Discography

References

Indian women playback singers
1993 births
Living people
Malayalam playback singers
21st-century Indian composers
Indian women rappers
21st-century Indian actresses
Women Carnatic musicians
Singers from Thrissur